

 
Tanami East is a locality in the Northern Territory of Australia located about  south of the territory capital of Darwin.

The locality consists of the following land in the north eastern portion of the Tanami Desert - the Karlantijpa North Aboriginal Land Trust, the Murranji Aboriginal Land Trust and the Murranji pastoral lease. Its boundaries and name were gazetted on 4 April 2007. 

The Adelaide-Darwin Railway passes from south to north through parts of the eastern side of the locality.

Tanami East includes the following places that have been listed on the Northern Territory Heritage Register – the Murranji Track, the Murranji Track, Murranji Bore & Waterhole and the Murranji Track, No. 11 Bore.

The 2016 Australian census which was conducted in August 2016 reports that Tanami East had 33 people living within its boundaries.

Tanami East is located within the federal division of Lingiari, the territory electoral division of Barkly and the local government area of the Barkly Region.

References

Populated places in the Northern Territory
Barkly Region
Tanami Desert